The Order of the Republic is an order of Tunisia, founded 16 March 1959.

Some major recipients

Grand Cross

National
 Mohamed Ennaceur
 Beji Caid Essebsi

Foreign
 : Abdelaziz Bouteflika
 : Carlos Menem
 : Anwar Sadat
 : Hosni Mubarak
 : Haile Selassie
 : Jacques Chirac
 : François Hollande
 : Emmanuel Macron
 : Giorgio Napolitano
 : Akihito
 : King Abdullah II
 : Princess Muna, Princess Mother
 : King Mohammed VI (Grand Cordon 1987; Collar 2014)
 : Moulay Hassan, Crown Prince of Morocco (2014)
 : Beatrix of the Netherlands
 : Yasser Arafat
 : Mahmoud Abbas
 : Prince Al-Waleed bin Talal
 : Prince Sultan bin Salman Al Saud (1985)
 : Mohammed bin Salman (2018)
 : Salman of Saudi Arabia (2019)
 : Léopold Sédar Senghor
 : Juan Carlos I
 : King Carl XVI Gustaf
 : Crown Princess Victoria, Duchess of Västergötland
 : Recep Tayyip Erdoğan (2017)
 : Elizabeth II
 : Prince Philip, Duke of Edinburgh

Grand Officer

National
 Mohamed Habib Gherab
 Kamel Morjane
 Mohamed Talbi
 Hichem Djait

Foreign
 : Princess Benedikte
 : Djamila Bouhired
 : Mohamed Belhocine

Commander
 : Milica Čubrilo
 : Benoît Puga
 : Yadh Ben Achour
 : Ahmed Zewail

References

External links

Orders, decorations, and medals of Tunisia
National symbols of Tunisia
1959 establishments in Tunisia
Awards established in 1959